Tarakab (also Romanized as Taraḵāb) is a village in Rud Zard Rural District, in the Central District of Bagh-e Malek County, Khuzestan Province, Iran. At the 2006 census, its population was 18, in 5 families.

References 

Populated places in Bagh-e Malek County